Edmund Wnuk-Lipiński (4 May 1944 – 4 January 2015) was a Polish sociologist, political scientist, and writer. A professor of sociology, he was the founder and first head of the Polish Academy of Sciences' Institute of Political Studies, and rector of the Warsaw-based Collegium Civitas.

He was also a fellow at the Institute of Human Sciences in Vienna, the University of Notre Dame, and Wissenschaftskolleg in Berlin, as well as a member of the Polish National Council for Civil Service and the National Council for European Integration. From 1999 he taught at the College of Europe (Natolin campus).

Apart from his scientific activities, Wnuk-Lipiński was also a successful author of science-fiction novels and novellas, and one of precursors of social science fiction genre in Poland (along with Janusz Zajdel). The middle part of his Apostezjon social fiction dystopia trilogy (Wir pamięci, Rozpad połowiczny, Mord założycielski) received the 1988 Janusz A. Zajdel Award for the best Polish science-fiction novel.

Wnuk-Lipiński was born in Sucha.

In 2001 he was awarded Commander's Cross of the Order of Polonia Restituta.

Selected books

Praca i wypoczynek w budżecie czasu (Balancing work and leisure), Wrocĺaw 1972

• Czas wolny – współczesność i perspektywy (Leisure – Contemporary and future
issues), Warszawa 1975

• Rozumienie kultury (Understanding culture), Warszawa 19754

• Budżet czasu – struktura społeczna – polityka społeczna (Time budget – social structure
-social policy), Wrocław 1980

• Equality and inequality under socialism – Poland and Hungary compared, London
1983 (Co-author and Co-editor with Tomas Kolosi)

• Nierówności i upośledzenia w świadomości społecznej (Inequalities and Deprivations
in Social Consciousness), Warszawa 1987, (editor and co-author)

• Grupy i więzi społeczne w monocentrycznym społeczeństwie masowym (Groups and
social bonds in a monocentric mass society), Warsaw 1990 (Editor and co-author)

• Non-market economies and inequalities in health, in "Social Science and Medicine",
vol.31, No. 8, 1990, London, (Co–author and Co-editor with Raymond Illsley)

• Polacy '88 – Dynamika konfliktu a szanse reform (Poles '88 – Dynamics of conflict
and chances for reforms), Warszawa 1989 (Co-author)

• Polacy '90 – Konflikty i zmiana (Poles '90 – Conflicts and change), Warsaw 1991 (Coauthor
and Co-editor)

• Rozpad połowiczny – Szkice z socjologii transformacji ustrojowej (Half-life – Essays
in the sociology of systemic transformation), Warszawa, 1992

• After Communism. A multidisciplinary approach to radical social change, Warsaw
1995 (Editor and Co-author)

• Elity w Polsce, w Rosji i na Węgrzech. Wymiana czy reprodukcja? (Elites in Poland,
Russia and Hungary. Circulation or reproduction?) (Co-author and Co-editor with
Ivan Szelenyi and Don Treiman), Warszawa, 1995 (The English version was published
in a special issue of “Theory and Society”, October 1995)

• Demokratyczna rekonstrukcja. Z socjologii radykalnej zmiany społecznej,
(Democratic reconstruction. The sociology of radical social change), PWN,
Warszawa 1996

• Values and radical social change. Comparing the Polish and South-African experience
(Co-author and Editor), Warsaw 1998

• Pierwsza dekada niepodległości. Próba socjologicznej syntezy. (The first decade of
independence. A tentative sociological synthesis) (Co-author and Editor), Institute of
Political Studies, Warsaw, 2001

• Granice wolności. Pamiętnik polskiej transformacji (The limits of freedom. The diary
of Polish transformation), Wyd. Scholar, Warszawa 2002

• Świat międzyepoki. Globalizacja – demokracja – państwo narodowe (A world between
epochs. Globalization – democracy – nation state), Znak, Kraków, 2004

• Socjologia życia publicznego (The sociology of public life), Scholar, Warszawa, First
edition – 2005, second edition – 2008 (this book is translated into Russian: Mysl
Publishers, Moscow)

• Democracy under stress. The global crisis and beyond (co-author and co-editor),
Barbara Budrich Publishers, Opladen – Berlin – Farmington Hills MI 2012.

References

External links
Wnuk-Lipiński's profile at Nauka Polska

1944 births
2015 deaths
Polish sociologists
Polish male writers
University of Notre Dame faculty
Members of the Polish Academy of Sciences
Polish science fiction writers
Commanders of the Order of Polonia Restituta
People from Tuchola County
Academic staff of Collegium Civitas